Quarantine was an antivirus software from the early 90s that automatically isolated infected files on a computer's hard disk. Files put in quarantine were then no longer capable of infecting their hosting system.

Development and release
In December, 1988, shortly after the Morris Worm, work started on Quarantine, an anti-malware and file reliability product.  Released in April, 1989, Quarantine was the first such product to use file signature instead of viral signature methods.

The original Quarantine used Hunt's B-tree database of files with both their CRC16 and CRC-CCITT signatures. Doubling the signatures rendered useless, or at least immoderately difficult, attacks based on CRC invariant modifications. Release 2, April 1990, used a CRC-32 signature and one based on CRC-32 but with a few bits in each word shuffled. The subsequent MS-AV from Microsoft, designed by Check Point, apparently relied on only an eight bit checksum—at least out of a few thousand files there were hundreds with identical signatures.

Functionality
Quarantine
 allowed suspect files to be
 Deleted
 Moved to a quarantine area
 Flagged in a report
 Standard executables were scanned, or one could use up to twenty file matching patterns
 Twenty exclusion patterns were available
 Twenty directory paths could be included, or twenty excluded

The 1990 version also allowed
 Background processing
 Checking of executables and libraries as a file is opened
 Timing of checks, e.g. if one opened a word file, WORD and all its libraries could be checked:
 Immediately
 Every half an hour
 Once a day or every ten days, etc.

Quarantine allowed system managers to track all modifications of a selected files or file structures, hence Quarantine users also got early warnings of failing disks or disk interface cards.

Achievements
In 1990 Quarantine received the LAN Magazine, Best of Year, Security award. In that year "Quarantine" was reportedly responsible for finding the first stealth virus at the University of Toronto, when all pattern matching virus detectors had failed.

Legacy
The efforts and expenses to convert Quarantine to other platforms went unrewarded as Tripwire's 1991 copy of Quarantine for *nix was better funded and publicized than OnDisk could afford to match.

Later efforts include modularized reliability and intrusion approaches that include either SHA-1 or MD5 signatures, or both if you like. Quarantine stopped shipping in 1994.

References

Antivirus software